is a retired Japanese freestyle wrestler. He won a silver medal at the 1960 Olympics and placed fifth at the 1961 World Championship.

References

External links
 

1939 births
Living people
Olympic wrestlers of Japan
Wrestlers at the 1960 Summer Olympics
Japanese male sport wrestlers
Olympic silver medalists for Japan
Olympic medalists in wrestling
Medalists at the 1960 Summer Olympics
20th-century Japanese people
21st-century Japanese people